The swastika, which is found on Slavic and Baltic patterns (on embroidery and ornaments of weapons and armor), is a traditional Slavic symbol and is used in modern neo-paganism (see “”). Today, the swastika is officially used by Baltic neo-pagan organizations such as Romuva and Dievturiba.

See also 
Swastika (Germanic Iron Age)

References

Slavic deities
Slavic mythology
Slavic neopaganism